The Volta Powerhouses are hydroelectric generation plants located in southern Shasta County, California, between Shingletown and Manton.  Volta Powerhouse I  was built in 1901 by Keswick Electric Power Company; Volta Powerhouse II was built in 1980.

Notes

Hydroelectric power plants in California
Buildings and structures in Shasta County, California
Energy infrastructure completed in 1901
Energy infrastructure completed in 1980